is a 2014 Japanese romance film based on the novel by Hiromi Kawakami. It was directed by Nami Iguchi who also directed Hito no Sex o Warauna in 2008. The film was released on February 8, 2014.

Cast
 Yutaka Takenouchi as Yukihiko Nishino
 Machiko Ono as Manami
 Riko Narumi as Subaru
 Fumino Kimura as Tama
 Tsubasa Honda as Kanoko
 Kumiko Asō as Natsumi
 Sawako Agawa as Sayuri Sasaki

References

External links
 

2014 films
2010s Japanese films
2010s Japanese-language films
Japanese romance films
2010s romance films
Films based on Japanese novels